JWK may refer to:
 JW Komandosów, a special forces unit of Poland
 Joanne Whalley (born 1964), English actress sometimes credited as Joanne Whalley-Kilmer
 JSON Web Key in JSON Web Signature
 Warwick railway station, Perth, in Western Australia